Shock Troops is a 1967 French-Italian action drama film directed by Costa-Gavras. It was entered into the 5th Moscow International Film Festival. Film producer Harry Saltzman has a "presented by" credit.

Plot
Set in central France, the film follows French resistance fighters who press the battle on the Germans. Along the way, they break into a prison and release some German prisoners, but discover there may be a spy planted to flush them all out.

Cast
 Charles Vanel as Passevin
 Bruno Cremer as Cazal
 Jean-Claude Brialy as Jean
 Michel Piccoli as The Extra Man
 Gérard Blain as Thomas
 Claude Brasseur as Groubec
 Jacques Perrin as Kerk
 François Périer as Moujon
 Claude Brosset as Ouf
 Pierre Clémenti as Lucian
 Michel Creton as Solin
 Paolo Fratini as Philippe
 Julie Dassin as Girl
 Nino Segurini as Lecocq
 Marc Porel as Octave

References

External links
 

1967 films
1967 drama films
French war drama films
Italian war drama films
1960s French-language films
Films directed by Costa Gavras
Films about the French Resistance
French action drama films
Italian action drama films
1960s action drama films
French World War II films
Italian World War II films
1960s French films
1960s Italian films